Cem Tuncer (born 27 July 1978) is a bass guitarist, composer, arranger and producer. He was born in Germany but moved to London, England where he has had his career. He began playing bass guitar at the age of 21. In 2004, he started playing jazz. He has taken part mainly in jazz festivals such as Betone and Tribass, which are both band projects.  He has released his own album Buddha’s Groove. In 2009, he established drum and bass workshops in Turkish universities. He has composed many original songs for short films and documentaries. He also produces music for commercials and promotion films and sound design for performances and movies.

References

External links
 Cem Tuncer website
 Cem Tuncer IMDB

1978 births
Living people
20th-century German people
People from Sivas
People from Ankara
Turkish bass guitarists
Turkish composers
Jazz bass guitarists
Musicians from London